Pustec Municipality (Opshtina Pustets), previously known as Liqenas Commune from 1973 to 2013, is a municipality in the Korçë County of Albania. The population at the 2011 census was 3,290, in a total area of 243.60 km2. The municipality's flag features the Vergina Sun.

It consists of nine villages, comprising the areas along the Albanian, the southwestern shore of Lake Prespa. It is part of the so-called Mala Prespa area, which is home to a large part of the local ethnic Macedonian minority of Albania. Albanian and Macedonian are official languages of the municipality.

History 

The village of Cerje was first mentioned in documents from the 14th century. The names of other villages were found in more modern documents. According to a 1900 ethnographic survey, the number of inhabitants at the time was 1,830.
The "La Macédoine et sa Population Chrétienne" survey by Dimitar Mishev (D. Brankov) from 1905 shows that the local Christian inhabitants were divided between Bulgarian Exarchate and Patriarchate of Constantinople. On 18 March 2013, the Albanian government changed the official name of the municipality, from the Albanian Liqenas to the Macedonian Pustec.

Villages in Pustec Municipality
The municipality contains nine villages.

Cerje
Dollna Goricë
Glloboçen
Gorna Goricë
Leskë
Pustec
Shulin
Tuminec
Zërnovskë

Demographics
According to the 2011 census, 97% of the municipality's residents were ethnic Macedonians and 96% were Orthodox Christians.

Education
Each of the nine villages in the municipality has an elementary school. Gorna Gorice has an 8-year school, while Pustec has both an 8-year school and a secondary school.

Twinned municipalities
  Novaci Municipality, North Macedonia

Notes

References

See also

Mala Prespa
Macedonians in Albania

Municipalities in Korçë County
 
Administrative units of Pustec Municipality
Macedonian communities in Albania
bg:Мала Преспа